Maléfices (French for "Evil Acts" or "Hexes"), subtitled "The roleplaying game with the scent of sulphur", was published by Jeux Descartes in 1985 as the first original French-language horror role-playing game. Three editions, 13 adventures and a bestiary have been published, and a fourth edition is being developed.

Description
Maléfices is set in France during the years of  La Belle Époque (1870–1914), and is a mixture of horror fantasy and Jules Verne technology. All player characters belong to  le club Pythagore (The Pythagorean Club) in Paris, which is designed to resemble Golden Dawn, the historical British secret society that was devoted to the study and practice of the occult, metaphysics, and paranormal activities. As members of the club, player characters are recruited to go on quests or investigate unusual happenings.

Components (1st and 2nd editions)
The boxed set contains:
56-page rule book
48-page scenario booklet, contains two adventures, La Malédiction de Fontevrault (The Curse at Fontevrault) and Une Etrange Maison de Poupées (A Strange Dollhouse).)
gamemaster's screen
blank character sheets
two ten-sided dice
20-card proprietary Tarot deck
21 two-sided cardboard character figures with plastic bases
	
The rules cover character creation, system mechanics, combat rules, magic rules, and the creation and use of non-player characters, animals and supernatural creatures. 

Historical background material is divided into three parts: "France between 1870 and 1914"; a 4-page timeline of French history; and "Witchcraft, Beliefs and Superstition in Nineteenth-century France."

Third edition
The third edition is contained in a single book that describes a great deal of historical and sociological information, as well as police services, investigative and forensic techniques of the period, the Law, procedures of trial and judgement, and typical sentences and punishments. It also includes two adventures, La Jeune Fille et la Mort ("The Maiden and Death"), and L'Enfant de Colère ("The Child of Wrath").

Character generation
The player first picks a profession for the player character; female characters are limited to professions that were socially acceptable during La Belle Epoque. The player then rolls dice to determine age and constitution. These will result in scores between 1–20 for four physical attributes (Strength, Dexterity, Education, and Perception). The player divides a pool of twenty points between two spiritual attributes (Reason and Faith), although neither can have a score lower than 6. The gamemaster secretly rolls dice to determine a score of 5–20 for the character's magical attribute (Flow). 

Finally the player draws five Tarot cards, four of which the player can see; the fifth is secretly recorded by the gamemaster. These cards can grant bonuses or inflict penalties when the player character attempts to use their abilities. For example the Archangel and the Priest give bonuses to Faith, The Devil and The Sorcerer give bonuses to Reason, and The Great Grimoire gives bonuses to Flow, Faith and Reason.

Gameplay
The game uses a pair of ten-sided dice and a proprietary deck of tarot cards to resolve actions. A color-coded table indicates the number the player has to achieve. Both Pass and Fail results are then graded from  "A" (Perfect) to "E" (Terrible), and are modified by drawing Tarot cards. 

The fourth edition currently being developed will use twenty-sided dice instead of ten-sided dice.

Publication history
Maléfices was created by Michel Gaudo and Guillaume Rohmer, and published by Jeux Descartes in 1985 as a boxed set with artwork by Didier Guiserix and Gilles Lautussier. Eight adventures and a bestiary were also published. 

In 1988, Jeux Descartes published a revised second edition and three more adventures.

In 2006, a greatly expanded third edition in the form of 290-page softcover book and two more adventures were published by Editions du Club Pythagore. The third edition was reprinted in 2007 by Asmodée Éditions.

In 2016 Arkhane Asylum Publishing acquired the rights to Maléfices from Michel Gaudo. In October 2018 they were crowdfunded through Ulule to begin work on a new version of the game and new adventures. They also planned to reissue revised versions of the old supplements and adventures. In 2021, with work on the 4th edition still underway, Arkhane published the first issue of L'Étoile du Matin (The Morning Star), a periodical with articles designed to support adventures that will be developed in the future.

Reception
Léo Sigrann, writing for Chroniques d'Altaride, commented on the mix of horror and Belle Epoque steampunk, saying "the fantastic and the Jules Verne technologies coexist in exciting and tortuous scenarios." He also called the use of the Tarot deck to modify action resolutions "one of the unique originalities of the game." Sigrann concluded that the game was "a treat for the gamemaster and the players!"

In his 2014 book Game Magic: A Designer's Guide to Magic Systems in Theory and Practice, Jeff Howard notes that "the supernatural forces in the game are hidden, almost invisible, to the point that players may never actually encounter a demon even though the entire game is built around implications of diabolical influence. The metaphor of a faint 'odor of sulphur' is a fascinating design goal."

Olivier Caïra counted Maléfices among those role-playing games which introduced more complex narratives into the genre in the 1980s.

Other reviews and commentary
 Casus Belli #30 (January 1986, p.58)
 Casus Belli #42 (December 1987, p.30)
Jeux & Stratégie #37

List of related publications

Modules

No.1 Le drame de la rue des Récollets ("A Tragedy in the Street of the Recollects") [Jeux Descartes 1985 (1st edition)] by Michel Gaudo. (24 pages)
No.2 L'énigmatique carnet du Capitaine Pop Plinn ("The Puzzling Notebook of Captain Pop Plinn") [Jeux Descartes 1985 (1st edition)] by Hervé Fontanières
No.3 Délivrez-nous du mal ("Deliver Us from Evil...") [Jeux Descartes 1986] by Hervé Fontanières
No.4 Les brasiers ne s'éteignent jamais ("The Fires Never Burn Out") [Jeux Descartes 1986] by Michel Gaudo (48 pages)
No.5 Le dompteur de volcans ("The Tamer of Volcanoes") [Jeux Descartes 1986] by Michel Gaudo
No.6 Enchères sous pavillon noir ("Bidding on a Black Banner") [Jeux Descartes 1987] by Pascal Gaudo
No.7 La musique adoucit les meurtres ("Music Makes Murders Much Sweeter") [Jeux Descartes 1987] by Michel Gaudo
No.8 Le montreur d'ombres ("The Caster of Shadows") [Jeux Descartes 1987] by Hervé Fontanières (56 pages)
No.9 Folies viennoises (A pun meaning either "Viennese Cabaret" or "Viennese Madness") [Jeux Descartes 1988] by Daniel Bilous & Nicole Bilous
No.10 Cœur cruel ("Cruel Heart") [Jeux Descartes 1988] by Hervé Fontanières
No.11 Le voile de Kali ("The Veil of Kali") [Jeux Descartes 1994] by Michel Gaudo & Pascal Gaudo (112 pages)
No.12 Danse macabre ("The Grim Dance") [Editions du Club Pythagore 2004] by Daniel Dugourd (76 pages)
No.13 La cornemuse du vieux Jeremiah ("Old Jeremiah's Bagpipes") [Editions du Club Pythagore 2005] by Daniel Dugourd
Les Chasses du Comte Lassary ("The Hunts of Count Lassary") [1991] by Michel Gaudo.

Supplements
A la Lisière de la Nuit ("At the Edge of Night") [Jeux Descartes 1986 (1st edition rules)] by Hervé Fontanières, Michel Gaudo & Guillaume Rohmer (104 pages)
Le Bestiaire ("The Bestiary") [Jeux Descartes 1988 (2nd edition rules)] by Michel Gaudo & Pascal Gaudo
CatéSchisme [Asmodee Editions 2007 (3rd edition rules)] by Olivier Babarit, Daniel Dugourd, Michel Gaudo, & Jean-Philippe Palanchini

See also
Paris in the Belle Époque
Daniel Dugourd, "Maléfices : odeur de soufre sur l'École des chartes", Olivier Caïra (ed.) and Jérôme Larré (ed.), Jouer avec l'histoire, Pinkerton Press, 2009

References

	
	

French role-playing games
Horror role-playing games
Role-playing games introduced in 1985
Belle Époque